All the three elections, that had been held in the municipality following the 2007 municipal reform, had ended in Morten Andersen from Venstre becoming mayor. In the 2017 election, Venstre would even win a seat majority.

Morten Andersen was seeking a fourth term for this election. He was expected to succeed in his attempt.

In the final result, Venstre would lose a seat, despite them increasing their vote share by 2.5%. However the traditional blue bloc parties won 15 seats, and it was expected that he would continue. This was eventually confirmed.

Electoral system
For elections to Danish municipalities, a number varying from 9 to 31 are chosen to be elected to the municipal council. The seats are then allocated using the D'Hondt method and a closed list proportional representation.
Nordfyn Municipality had 25 seats in 2021

Unlike in Danish General Elections, in elections to municipal councils, electoral alliances are allowed.

Electoral alliances  

Electoral Alliance 1

Electoral Alliance 2

Results

Notes

References 

Nordfyn